No Tomorrow may refer to:

Film and TV
No Tomorrow (1957 film), a Swedish film directed by Arne Mattsson
No Tomorrow (1999 film), an American film, directed by Master P
No Tomorrow (2016 film), a South Korean film
No Tomorrow (TV series), an American romantic fantasy dramedy series
"No Tomorrow" (How I Met Your Mother), a 2008 episode of How I Met Your Mother

Literature
Killing Eve: No Tomorrow, a 2019 spy thriller novel by Luke Jennings

Music
"No Tomorrow" (Orson song), 2006
"No Tomorrow" (Brandy song), 2020
"No Tomorrow", by Gotthard from Human Zoo
"No Tomorrow", by Suede from Night Thoughts

See also
"Not Tomorrow", by Living Colour from The Chair in the Doorway
"Not Tomorrow Yet", a 2016 episode of The Walking Dead